Shitala Mata Temple is a 12th-century Hindu temple dedicated to goddess Shitala located in Butapaldi village of Mehsana district, Gujarat, India.

Architecture
The east-facing Shitala Mata temple was built in about 12th century. It has three parts: mandapa, antarala and garbhagriha (sanctum). The platform has friezes of kirtimukha, elephants, humans and deities. The doorframe of the sanctum has images of Vishnu in five niches in top section and while images of Laxmi in niches in the side sections. On the exterior walls of the sanctum, there is an image of Parvati in south niche and the images of Mahishasurmandini (Chamunda)  in north and west niches. The vedika (altar), kakshasana (seatings), small pillars and the ceiling of the mandapa are decorated with fine carvings. A bust of an image is enshrined in place of the original image in the sanctum which is worshiped locally as Brahmani or Shitala Mata.

It is a state protected monument (S-GJ-286).

Gallery

References

12th-century Hindu temples
Hindu temples in Gujarat
Mehsana district
Māru-Gurjara architecture